Moon Lau Pui-yuet (born 9 September 1989) is a Hong Kong actress under Television Broadcasts Limited (TVB) management. She also holds the second runner-up title of the 2013 Miss Hong Kong Pageant.

Early and personal life
Moon Lau was born in Hong Kong and lived with a large family of seven. Her mother, Lam Kiu (林嬌), was contestant #15 in the 1985 Miss Hong Kong Pageant.She also has a younger brother. Lau attended Baptist Lui Ming Choi Secondary School located in the Sha Tin district of Hong Kong. In 2011, she graduated from Hong Kong Baptist University with a Bachelor of Social Sciences in Communication (Honours), majoring in Film and Media Arts.

During university, Lau worked as a model, signed under agency Jacso Entertainment for two years. After graduating from university she worked as an airline flight attendant for two years and later as a project manager before signing up for the 2013 Miss Hong Kong Pageant.

Friendship 
Lau became best friends with Jeannie Chan and Stephanie Ho as they became close while filming the drama Raising the Bar. She is also good friends with William Chak, Adrian Chau, Daniel Chau, Joey Law, Roxanne Tong, Tammy Au-yueng, Bob Cheung, Matthew Ho, Hubert Wu, Jacky Cai and Hera Chan.

Career

Pageant Career (2013)
Lau entered the 2013 Miss Hong Kong Pageant in May 2013. She was contestant #6 and was the tallest of all participants, standing at 5'8.5″. The final list of 20 contestants were revealed at a press conference on 4 July 2013. Lau's chosen location for her photoshoot was Taipei, Taiwan, where she was grouped together with fellow contestants Sisley Choi and Vicky Chan. The semifinal round was held live on 25 August 2013. Lau's Q&A question was given by Carol Cheng, who asked Lau the size of the home she grew up in since she came from a large family of seven, to which Lau answered, "I grew up in a comfortably well-off family. Our house is about a 1,000 feet." With 29,835 votes, Lau became the fifth of ten total contestants to make it into the final round. On 1 September 2013, she was crowned the 2013 Miss Hong Kong second runner-up with a total of 60,000 votes.

Acting Career (2015–present) 
After participating in the 2013 Miss Hong Kong Pageant, Lau hosted variety shows as a beginner. In 2014, she filmed her first television drama, Raising The Bar, which was broadcast in early 2015. In mid-late 2016, Lau starred in the critically acclaimed martial arts drama A Fist Within Four Walls. She won the Best New TVB Artiste award at the 2016 StarHub TVB Awards and the Favourite TVB Most Improved Female Artiste award at the 2016 TVB Star Awards Malaysia. In the drama Two Steps from Heaven, Lau gained recognition with her role as the third party of Bosco Wong’s character and garnered her first Best Supporting Actress nomination at the 2016 TVB Anniversary Awards. With her performance in 2016, she earned her first nomination for Most Improved Female Artiste as well.

In 2017, Lau's performance in the critically acclaimed supernatural drama The Exorcist's Meter was well received, for which she garnered her first Most Popular Female Character nomination at the 2017 TVB Anniversary Awards. In 2018, Lau took on her first female leading role in the drama Life On The Line, earning her first Best Actress nomination at the 2018 TVB Anniversary Awards. In December 2018, she starred as the female lead in the drama Wife Interrupted, again collaborating with Hubert Wu.

In 2020, Lau reprised her role in the sequel The Exorcist’s 2nd Meter, for which she was placed among the top 5 nominees for the Most Improved Female Artiste at the 2020 TVB Anniversary Awards. In 2021, Lau received attention with her villainous role in the crime drama Sinister Beings. With her role in the time-travelling drama Take Two, she was placed among the top 5 nominees for the Best Supporting Actress at the 2021 TVB Anniversary Awards.

At the 2022 TVB Anniversary Awards, Lau won the Favourite TVB Actress in Malaysia award for her role, Lee Ching-yi in The War of Beauties.

Published works 
Lau had been influenced by her grandfather, who was an author, into reading and writing books since she was young. One of her lifetime goals was to release her own book before the age of 30. After stepping into the entertainment industry, Lau focused on acting, but she never forgot about her childhood dream of becoming an author.

Smiling My Way Through (2018) 

In April 2018, Lau went to America with her makeup artist and photographer to take photos for her book. She wrote a book on her own life experiences as well as her journey to becoming an actress. On 7 July 2018, Lau officially announced on Instagram that she would be releasing her own multimedia book called Smiling My Way Through (我的微笑之道). Her book was released on 18 July 2018, featuring at the Hong Kong Book Fair 2018. There was a book signing there as well. Since it was a self-funded book, only 3000 copies were printed, where part of it was sold online to international readers. With positive feedback on her first book, Lau expressed she would consider writing a second book in 2019.

Filmography

Television Dramas

TVB

Shaw Brothers

Television Host

Awards and nominations

Miss Hong Kong 2013

StarHub TVB Awards

TVB Star Awards Malaysia

TVB Anniversary Awards

People's Choice Television Awards

Hong Kong Television Awards

AEG Entertainment Awards

Yahoo Asia Buzz Awards

References

External links
Moon Lau official webpage

1989 births
Living people
Hong Kong film actresses
Hong Kong television actresses
TVB actors
21st-century Hong Kong actresses
Alumni of Hong Kong Baptist University